Third Beach is located at Ferguson Point in  Stanley Park in Vancouver, British Columbia.

References

External links
 

Beaches of Vancouver
Stanley Park